John Michael Ormonde (15 September 1905 – 25 June 1981) was an Irish Fianna Fáil politician.

Early and personal life
He was born 15 September 1905 at Lismore, County Waterford, the son of John Ormonde, shopkeeper, and his wife, Ann Ormonde (née O'Brien). He was educated at the Lismore CBS. A member of Fianna Éireann, he delivered dispatches during the Irish Civil War, until his arrest before his seventeenth birthday in 1923. He was imprisoned in Lismore castle and Fermoy, but he escaped and remained on the run until the end of the civil war.

He attended De La Salle College Waterford and qualified as a teacher in 1928. He was appointed principal of Kilmacthomas national school, County Waterford, in 1932.

He married Hanna Mary Hickey, a nurse, in July 1931. They had one daughter and three sons. His son Donal was a Fianna Fáil TD for Waterford from 1982 to 1987.

Politics
A founder member of Fianna Fáil in Waterford, he became a member of Waterford County Council. He was elected to Dáil Éireann at a by-election in October 1947 as a Fianna Fáil Teachta Dála (TD) for the Waterford constituency. In 1957 he joined the cabinet of Éamon de Valera as Minister for Posts and Telegraphs. He served in government until 1959. He lost his Dáil seat at the 1965 general election. He was elected to the Labour Panel at the 1965 election to the 11th Seanad.

See also
Families in the Oireachtas

References

 

1905 births
1981 deaths
Fianna Fáil TDs
Members of the 12th Dáil
Members of the 13th Dáil
Members of the 14th Dáil
Members of the 15th Dáil
Members of the 16th Dáil
Members of the 17th Dáil
Members of the 11th Seanad
Politicians from County Waterford
Fianna Fáil senators
Alumni of De La Salle Teacher Training College, Waterford